Marten Elco de Roon (born 29 March 1991) is a Dutch professional footballer who plays as a midfielder for  club Atalanta and the Netherlands national team. He formerly played for Sparta Rotterdam, SC Heerenveen and Middlesbrough.

Early life
De Roon was born in Zwijndrecht and raised in Hendrik-Ido-Ambacht, where he played in youth teams of ASWH. From ASWH, he continued to youth teams of Feyenoord and Sparta Rotterdam.

Club career

Sparta Rotterdam
De Roon made his Eredivisie debut for Sparta Rotterdam on 27 March 2010, starting in the match against Twente at De Grolsch Veste. He made a total of three appearances in the Eredivisie for the 2009–10 season.

Heerenveen
In April 2012, Eredivisie club SC Heerenveen announced the signing of De Roon on a three-year contract.

Atalanta
In July 2015, De Roon was signed by Serie A side Atalanta.

Middlesbrough
On 4 July 2016, De Roon signed for newly-promoted Premier League side Middlesbrough for a reported £12 million transfer fee. He scored his first goal for his new club – a 91st-minute equaliser – on 5 November 2016 in a 1–1 draw with Manchester City at the Etihad Stadium. He went on to score a further 3 league goals for the club over the remainder of the season, including the only goal in a victory over Sunderland in the Tees–Wear derby, however Middlesbrough were relegated on 8 May 2017. On 18 July 2017, Middlesbrough confirmed that they paid £8.8 million for De Roon, with Atalanta earning another £900,000 after the midfielder played 30 games for the club.

Return to Atalanta
On 10 August 2017, De Roon re-signed for Atalanta for an undisclosed fee. He once again cemented himself as a starter under Gian Piero Gasperini, and helped Atalanta finish in a historic 3rd place in the 2018–19 season, earning them a spot in the 2019–20 UEFA Champions League group stage. He also scored a volley against Fiorentina in the Coppa Italia semi-finals in the 58th minute. Atalanta would win the tie 5–4, though lost in the final against Lazio. He made his Champions League debut on 18 September 2019 against Dinamo Zagreb.

International career
De Roon has represented the Netherlands under-19 national team in the qualification rounds for the 2010 UEFA European Under-19 Football Championship. On 12 November 2009, he made his debut and scored his first goal for the U-19 Oranje in a qualification match against Malta. On 13 November 2016, he made his debut for the senior team.

He was later named in the first Dutch squad chosen by new national team manager Ronald Koeman. This was in March 2018 for the friendlies against England and Portugal.

Career statistics

Club

International

References

External links

Profile at the Atalanta B.C. website

1991 births
Living people
Footballers from Zwijndrecht, Netherlands
Footballers from Hendrik-Ido-Ambacht
Association football midfielders
Dutch footballers
Netherlands youth international footballers
Netherlands international footballers
ASWH players
Feyenoord players
Sparta Rotterdam players
SC Heerenveen players
Atalanta B.C. players
Middlesbrough F.C. players
Eredivisie players
Eerste Divisie players
Serie A players
Premier League players
English Football League players
UEFA Euro 2020 players
2022 FIFA World Cup players
Dutch expatriate footballers
Expatriate footballers in Italy
Expatriate footballers in England
Dutch expatriate sportspeople in Italy
Dutch expatriate sportspeople in England